Collins Classics is a record label which specialises in classical music.  It was founded in 1989 as a musical subsidiary of HarperCollins Publishers and distributed through Pinnacle Entertainment (United Kingdom).

Artists who recorded for the label include Sir Peter Maxwell Davies, the Duke Quartet, choral group the Sixteen, Harry Christophers and Joanna MacGregor. Collins Classics also recorded over 130 albums with world renowned orchestras including the London Philharmonic Orchestra, London Symphony Orchestra, Royal Philharmonic Orchestra, Academy of St. Martin in the Fields, Munich Symphony Orchestra and many more.

In 2008 the label was sold to Phoenix Music International Ltd who continue to distribute the Collins Classics label digitally.

See also
 List of record labels

References
 "Collins Classics To Be Closed". Billboard,10 October 1998

British record labels
Record labels established in 1989
Record labels disestablished in 1998
Classical music record labels